Europa FM is a Romanian radio station which started airing on 26 May 2000. Its programming consists of a variety of shows, including news, music and morning shows. It was previously owned by Lagardère Active, but has been owned by Czech Media Invest since 2018. A number of notable Romanian journalists have been part of the news team, including Andreea Esca, Cristian Tudor Popescu, and Cătălin Tolontan.

References

Radio stations in Romania
Romanian-language radio stations
Radio stations established in 2000
2000 establishments in Romania